Unaccredited institutions of higher education may include legitimate religious institutions offering ordination or doctoral degrees based on religious training, but most other unaccredited institutions are diploma mills offering counterfeit degrees for a price.

Degrees offered by unaccredited religious institutions 
Some unaccredited religious institutions may award degrees that are accepted by civil service or other employers, though employment qualifications vary from state to state in the United States. Some seminaries and bible colleges see accreditation issues as a government intrusion on religious freedom. Unaccredited bible colleges may offer associate's degrees, diplomas, or certificates. Seminary degree titles offered may be Doctor of Divinity (D.D. or D.Div.).

Historical perspectives: diploma mill degrees 
The Council for Higher Education Accreditation (CHEA) has reported,

Walter C. John wrote in School Life in 1937 that he first learned of "counterfeit degrees" in 1903. John listed examples of counterfeit degrees offered: "Business psychologist, practitioner of truth, doctor of psychology, doctor of metaphysics, doctor of divinity".

Describing "$100 doctors" in 1940, Joseph Burton Vaschen listed the degree offerings of five degree mills: Doctor of Psychology (Ps.D.), Doctor of Metaphysics (Ms.D.), Doctor of Divinity (D.D.), Doctor of Psychology (Ps.D.), Doctor of Mental Science (D.M.S.), Doctor of Universal Truth (U.T.D.), Degree of Master of Education (M.Ed), or Doctor of Philosophy (Ph.D.) in Education, and Doctor of Education (Ed.D.).

A review of Morris Fishbein's 1949 article, "Beware the Mind-Meddler" in Woman's Home Companion, highlighted the need for legislative action "to restrain those charlatans who prey on the goodwill and the wallets of emotionally disturbed people". Fishbein had written, "...there is not one state in the union with adequate legal standards stipulating who may and who may not dispense psychologic advice." He identified "Doctor of Psychology" and "Doctor of Metaphysics" as "quack degrees".

A 1960 study of doctorates unaccredited institutions offered for psychotherapists included a table with the following degrees:
 Doctor of Psychology
 Doctor of Metaphysics
 Doctor of Science
 Doctor of Psychotherapy
 Doctor of BioPsychology (BPD)
 Doctor of Philosophy in Metaphysics (PhDM)
 Doctor of Divinity in Metaphysics (DDM)
 Doctor of Divinity
 Doctor of Naturatics (NaD)
 Master of Psychology and Scientific Truth (ScTM)
 Master of Psychic Science (MPsSc)
 Licentiate in Hypnotherapy (LHy)
 Psychic Reader
 Metaphysical Counselor
 Master Metaphysician
 Ordination

In 2019, Bruce Thayer described "legitimate approaches to earning the social work doctorate on a parttime or nonresidential basis" and then identified "predatory social work" programs offering degrees in sex therapy, clinical hypnotherapy, metaphysical hypnosis, natural health, transpersonal psychology, and transpersonal counseling.

According to CHEA, "...there is more and more pressure on individuals to earn degrees, not only bachelor's degrees, but master's and doctoral degrees as well. Jobs and promotions increasingly go to individuals with the greatest educational qualifications, even when individuals' work experience may be more relevant to the job than is a degree. This creates pressures on individuals to obtain degrees, tempting some to take the easy route to a degree – the degree mill."

See also 

 Accreditation mill
 Diploma mills in the United States
 Educational accreditation
 List of animals awarded human credentials
 List of evangelical seminaries and theological colleges
 List of unrecognized higher education accreditation organizations
 List of unaccredited institutions of higher learning
 Name It and Frame It?
 Unaccredited institutions of higher education
 Résumé fraud

References

External links 

 Diploma Mills Are Easily Created and Some Have Issued Bogus Degrees to Federal Employees at Government Expense

Unaccredited institutions of higher learning
Degrees offered by unaccredited institutions of higher education